Charles Day (May 28, 1844 to July 29, 1901) was an American soldier who fought in the American Civil War. Day received the country's highest award for bravery during combat, the Medal of Honor, for his action during the Battle of Hatcher's Run in Virginia on 6 February 1865. He was honored with the award on 20 July 1897.

Biography
Day was born in West Laurens, New York on 28 May 1844. He enlisted in the 210th Pennsylvania Infantry. He died on 29 July 1901 and his remains are interred at the Prospect Cemetery in Pennsylvania.

Medal of Honor citation

See also

List of American Civil War Medal of Honor recipients: A–F

References

1844 births
1901 deaths
People of Pennsylvania in the American Civil War
Union Army officers
United States Army Medal of Honor recipients
American Civil War recipients of the Medal of Honor